Olesya Novikova is a Russian ballet dancer. She is a principal dancer with the Mariinsky Theatre.

She was born in Saint Petersburg and studied at the Vaganova Academy of Russian Ballet. Upon graduation, she joined the Mariinsky Theatre; she has toured with them in Great Britain, Germany and China. Novikova won a prize at the International Vaganova-Prix Ballet Dancers' Competition in 2002.

Novikova created the female lead role in Du Côté de chez “Swann” by Alexei Miroshnichenko. In 2011, she played the lead role in the ballet Raymonda.

In 2021, Novikova was promoted to the rank of Principal dancer of the Mariinsky Theatre.

She is married to Leonid Sarafanov.

Repertoire

La Sylphide (the Sylph); choreography by August Bournonville
Giselle (Giselle); choreography by Jean Coralli, Jules Perrot, and Marius Petipa
Le Corsaire (Gulnare); choreography by Marius Petipa
La Bayadère (Nikiya, Gamzatti); choreography by Marius Petipa
The Sleeping Beauty (Aurora, La Fee Miettes qui tombent, La Fee Coulante, fleur de farine, Gold Fairy, Silver Fairy); choreography by Marius Petipa, version by Konstantin Sergeyev
The Sleeping Beauty (Aurora, Generosity Fairy, Silver Fairy); choreography by Marius Petipa, version by Sergei Vikharev
Swan Lake (Odette-Odile, Pas de trois, Cygnets); choreography by Marius Petipa
Raymonda (Raymonda, grand pas, variation); choreography by Marius Petipa
Le Réveil de Flore (Flore); choreography by Marius Petipa
Don Quixote (Kitri, Flower Girl, Variation in Act IV); choreography by Alexander Gorsky
Chopiniana (Nocturne, Eleventh Waltz); choreography by Michel Fokine
Fountain of Bakhchisarai (Maria); choreography by Rostislav Zakharov
The Nutcracker (Masha); choreography by Vasili Vainonen
Romeo and Juliet (Juliet); choreography by Leonid Lavrovsky
Etudes; choreography by Harald Lander
Marguerite and Armand (Marguerite); choreography by Frederick Ashton
Manon (Courtesan); choreography by Kenneth MacMillan
Apollo (Polyhymnia); choreography by George Balanchine
Symphony in C (Third Movement); choreography by George Balanchine
The Four Temperaments; choreography by George Balanchine
Jewels (Emeralds, Rubies, Diamonds); choreography by George Balanchine
Ballet Imperial; choreography by George Balanchine
Theme and Variations; choreography by George Balanchine
Tchaikovsky Pas de Deux; choreography by George Balanchine
The Legend of Love (Shyrin); choreography by Yuri Grigorovich
Carmen Suite (Carmen); choreography by Alberto Alonso
Adagio Hammerklavier; choreography by Hans van Manen
5 Tangos; choreography by Hans van Manen
The Nutcracker (Masha); production by Mihail Chemiakin and Kirill Simonov
Middle Duet; choreography by Alexei Ratmansky
Anna Karenina (Anna); choreography by Alexei Ratmansky
The Vertiginous Thrill of Exactitude; choreography by William Forsythe
In the Middle, Somewhat Elevated; choreography by William Forsythe
Ondine (Ondine, Naiads); choreography by Pierre Lacotte
Without; choreography by Benjamin Millepied
Le Parc (Soloist); choreography by Angelin Preljocaj
Les noces; choreography by Bronislava Nijinska
Grand Pas Classique; choreography by Victor Gsovsky
The Meek One (the Meek One); choreography by Donvena Pandoursky
Flight of Angels (Soloist); choreography by Edwaard Liang
Du Cote de chez Swann; choreography by Alexei Miroshnichenko
Nirvana; choreography by Emil Faski

In 2011, at Teatro alla Scala she appeared in the lead role in the premiere performance of the ballet Raymonda (production by Sergei Vikharev)

References

External links

Year of birth missing (living people)
Living people
Vaganova graduates
Mariinsky Ballet first soloists
21st-century ballet dancers